The 35th Bachsas Awards were given by the Bangladesh Cholochitra Sangbadik Samity (Bangladesh Cine-Journalists' Association) to outstanding performers of the silver screen, small screen, music, dance and theatre in 2013. Awards was introduced in 1972 to encourage the fledgling film industry of the country.

List of winners

Film

Jury Board
Jury Board for this award were Dulal Khan, Chinmoy Mutsuddi, Alimuddin, Shamim Alam, Deepen, Mahmuda Chowdhury, Hiren Dey, Anwarul Kabir Bulu, Erfanul Haque Nahid, Imrul Shahid, Farid Bashar, Moinul Hoque Bhuiya, Rashidul Amin Holi, Rashed Rain, Liton Rahman, Tapos Biswas, Basir Jamal, Gias Ahmed, Soumik Hasan Sohag, Syed Sayeed, Ahmed Tuhin.

References 

Bachsas Awards
Awards established in 1975